The Fog is a soundtrack album composed and performed by John Carpenter, featuring the score to the 1980 film The Fog. It was released in 1984 through Varèse Sarabande. An expanded edition was released in 2000 through Silva Screen Records, containing an extra six tracks not included on the original release (one of them being an interview with Jamie Lee Curtis). In 2012, another expanded edition was released through Silva Screen Records, containing all of the tracks from the 2000 release and all of the original score cues.

John Carpenter considers it to be one of his best scores.

Track listing

2012 expanded edition

Personnel
 John Carpenter – composition, performance
 Dan Wyman – synthesizer programming
 Bob Walter – music coordinator
 Jim Cypherd – recording engineer

References

John Carpenter soundtracks
1984 soundtrack albums
Horror film soundtracks
Film scores
Varèse Sarabande soundtracks
Silva Screen Records soundtracks